Aleocharini is the type tribe of the subfamily Aleocharinae. It contains three subtribes, Aleocharina, Compactopediina and the Hodoxenina. The tribe contains 16 genera and over 460 species. The vast majority of biodiversity is distributed in the subtribe Aleocharina, which contains 450 species in 10 genera.

References

Aleocharinae
Polyphaga tribes